Christian Brothers School  was a Roman Catholic, boys, secondary, day school, located in Balmain, a central city suburb of Sydney, Australia.

History
The School was opened by the Christian Brothers in 1887 and closed down in 1990.

See also 
 List of Christian Brothers schools

References

External links 

Educational institutions established in 1887
Educational institutions disestablished in 1990
Defunct boys' schools in Australia
Defunct schools in New South Wales
Balmain, New South Wales
1887 establishments in Australia
1990 disestablishments in Australia
Former Congregation of Christian Brothers schools in Australia